Michael John Pasquella (November 7, 1898 – April 5, 1965), nicknamed "Toney", was a professional baseball player for one season. In 1919, he played for the Philadelphia Phillies and St. Louis Cardinals of Major League Baseball National League. He was officially listed as standing  and weighing .

Biography
Pasquella was born "Michael John Pasquariello" on November 7, 1898, in Philadelphia, Pennsylvania. He attended college at Villanova University, one of 48 players to attend that school.

Pasquella appeared for three teams during the 1919 season: two major league clubs and one in the minor leagues. As a minor leaguer, Pasquella played in 46 games for the Waco Navigators of the Texas League as a backup at first base to Roy Leslie. In the field, he recorded a .991 fielding percentage, making 444 putouts, 17 assists, and 4 errors. As a hitter, Pasquella batted .202 with seven doubles and a home run. When he played in the major leagues, he appeared first for the Philadelphia Phillies, playing in one game against the Chicago Cubs on July 9. He replaced Fred Luderus at first base—with Gene Packard in between as a pinch hitter—and notched his first major league hit in his debut at-bat. On July 31, Pasquella was playing for the St. Louis Cardinals against the Phillies, where Packard earned the victory for Philadelphia. Pasquella pinch-hit for pitcher Bill Sherdell, going hitless in his only Cardinals at-bat.

After playing, Pasquella worked as a minor league manager for three teams. He skippered the Crisfield Crabbers of the Eastern Shore League (ESL) in the 1926 and 1927 seasons, followed by the ESL's Easton Farmers in 1928, and the Greenville Tobacconists of the Eastern Carolina League in 1929; he returned to the Crabbers in 1937 for his final managerial job.

Pasquella died on April 5, 1965, in Bridgeport, Connecticut, and was buried in St. Michael Cemetery in the neighboring town of Stratford.

See also
Philadelphia Phillies all-time roster (P–Q)

References

External links

1898 births
1965 deaths
Baseball players from Philadelphia
Philadelphia Phillies players
St. Louis Cardinals players
Waco Navigators players